The 2020–21 Coupe de France preliminary rounds, Hauts-de-France was the qualifying competition to decide which teams from the leagues of the Hauts-de-France region of France took part in the main competition from the seventh round.

A total of eighteen teams qualified from the Hauts-de-France preliminary rounds. In 2019–20, Olympique Grande-Synthe and Stade Portelois progressed furthest in the main competition, reaching the ninth round before losing to AS Nancy (0–1) and Strasbourg (1–4) respectively.

Schedule
The first round, scheduled for the weekend of 30 August 2020, saw 982 teams enter the competition, from the Regional and District divisions. The draw was carried out within each district. 49 clubs were exempted to the second round, mainly from Régional 1 and Régional 2.

The third round draw, which saw the entry of the Championnat National 3 clubs, was made on 11 September 2020. The fifth round draw, which saw the entry of the single Championnat National team from the region, took place on 7 October 2020. The sixth round draw was made on 21 October 2020.

First round
These matches were played on 30 August 2020, with one replayed on 6 September 2020.

Second round
These matches were played on 5 and 6 September 2020, with two postponed until 13 September 2020.

Third round
These matches were played on 19 and 20 September 2020.

Fourth round
These matches were played on 3 and 4 October 2020.

Fifth round
These matches were played on 17 and 18 October 2020.

Sixth round
These matches were played on 30 and 31 January 2021.

References

preliminary rounds